Symfonia was a short-lived symphonic power metal supergroup formed in 2010 by Andre Matos (vocals), Timo Tolkki (guitars), Jari Kainulainen (bass), Mikko Härkin (keyboards) and Uli Kusch (drums). On February 18 of 2011, the band made its debut performance at Finnish Metal Expo. The band released its only album, In Paradisum, in March 2011.

History 
After touring together as members of Stratovarius and Angra, guitarist Timo Tolkki and vocalist Andre Matos became good friends. When Matos moved to Sweden, Tolkki called him and told him he had some song ideas he would like to show him. On the condition of being part of the songwriting process but not of the managing duties due to his other activities, Matos flew to Helsinki and started working on the songs, though at that time they did not know if those songs would be used in a band, or a project or anything alike. Tolkki then completed the team with other musicians who were living in the Nordic countries back then: bassist Jari Kainulainen, keyboardist Mikko Härkin and drummer Uli Kusch. Months later, the five musicians met in Helsinki and started rehearsing.

By October 2011 last news were that drummer Uli Kusch officially left the band to continue recovering from his nerve damage which made it impossible for him to play drums for a year. The band did a tour in South America (mostly in Brazil) and would start to record a new album subsequently.

By December 2011, Timo Tolkki announced in his official Facebook page that he would probably never record anything again (he later announced he would return to music with his new project, Avalon). In his long text, Timo cited some problems during the recording and touring of the first Symfonia album. Symfonia's homepage has since been replaced with a big red square with the verse "the key to the universe is love", which appears at the song "Key to the Universe" from Tolkki's solo album Hymn to Life. In a post at Symfonia's official forum Timo Tolkki stated that "ending the Symfonia as it is, was a rational decision based on both the opinions of me and Andre Matos and the hard evidence or facts.", thus confirming that the band is no more.

Commenting on the sudden end of the band in a 2013 interview, Matos said:

Tolkki and Matos remained out of touch since then. Matos died on June 8th, 2019.

Discography
In Paradisum (2011)

Line-up

Last line-up 
 Andre Matos - vocals (2010–2011)
 Timo Tolkki - guitar (2010–2011)
 Jari Kainulainen - bass (2010–2011)
 Mikko Härkin - keyboards (2010–2011)

Additional musicians 
 Alex Landenburg – drums (2011)

Former members 
 Uli Kusch - drums (2010–2011)

References

External links 
 

Musical groups established in 2010
Musical groups disestablished in 2011
Heavy metal supergroups
Finnish power metal musical groups
2010 establishments in Finland
2011 disestablishments in Finland